William James Evans (February 10, 1893 – December 21, 1946) was a pitcher in Major League Baseball who played for the Pittsburgh Pirates (1916–17, 1919). He was born in Reidsville, North Carolina.

In a three-season career, Evans posted a 2–13 record with a 3.85 ERA in 28 appearances, including 11 starts, six complete games, 10 games finished, 41 strikeouts, 48 walks, and 126⅓ innings pitched.

In 1918 Evans served in the military during World War I.  
 
An alumnus of Elon University and North Carolina State University, Evans died in Burlington, North Carolina at age 53.

References

Sources

1893 births
1946 deaths
Pittsburgh Pirates players
Major League Baseball pitchers
Baseball players from North Carolina
Kansas City Blues (baseball) players
Denver Bears players
Birmingham Barons players
American people of Welsh descent
Elon Phoenix baseball players
NC State Wolfpack baseball players